Udea sobrinalis is a moth in the family Crambidae. It was described by Achille Guenée in 1854. It is found in French Guiana.

References

sobrinalis
Moths of South America
Moths described in 1854
Taxa named by Achille Guenée